Claudine may refer to:

Name
 Claudine (given name), a feminine given name of French origin

Culture
 Claudine (film), a 1974 American film by John Berry
 Claudine (soundtrack), its soundtrack album. Music by Curtis Mayfield and Gladis Knight & the Pips
 Claudine (Claudine Longet album)
 Claudine (book series), the protagonist of a series of novels by Colette
 Claudine (TV series), a 2010 Philippine television series

Others
 Claudine (1811 ship)
 Prince Claudin or Claudine, son of the Frankish King Claudas in the Arthurian legend 
 Claudine (manga), a 1978 Japanese manga series